Ames is a city in Liberty County, Texas, United States. The population was 937 at the 2020 census.

Geography

Ames is located at  (30.0535, –94.7435).

Demographics

As of the 2020 United States census, there were 937 people, 413 households, and 231 families residing in the city.

As of the census of 2000, there were 1,079 people, 407 households, and 293 families residing in the city. The population density was 340.5 people per square mile (131.4/km2). There were 444 housing units at an average density of 140.1 per square mile (54.1/km2). The racial makeup of the city was 7.04% White, 89.34% African American, 0.28% Native American, 0.28% Asian, 1.58% from other races, and 1.48% from two or more races. Hispanic or Latino of any race were 1.58% of the population.

There were 407 households, out of which 31.2% had children under the age of 18 living with them, 42.3% were married couples living together, 24.8% had a female householder with no husband present, and 27.8% were non-families. 25.1% of all households were made up of individuals, and 9.1% had someone living alone who was 65 years of age or older. The average household size was 2.65 and the average family size was 3.18.

In the city, the population was spread out, with 28.3% under the age of 18, 8.2% from 18 to 24, 25.3% from 25 to 44, 24.7% from 45 to 64, and 13.5% who were 65 years of age or older. The median age was 36 years. For every 100 females, there were 89.6 males. For every 100 females age 18 and over, there were 83.4 males.

The median income for a household in the city was $23,421, and the median income for a family was $26,429. Males had a median income of $28,833 versus $21,250 for females. The per capita income for the city was $12,491. About 28.6% of families and 31.6% of the population were below the poverty line, including 38.3% of those under age 18 and 27.7% of those age 65 or over.

Education
Ames is served by the Liberty Independent School District. The Liberty Independent School District has two elementary schools, one intermediate school, and one high school. Students attend Liberty High School.

Cody Abshier is the Superintendent of Schools.

References

External links

Cities in Texas
Cities in Liberty County, Texas
Greater Houston